Royden Stanford Chambers (1 August 1892 – 4 October 1955) was a rugby union player who represented Australia.

Chambers, a centre, was born in Sydney and claimed a total of 2 international rugby caps for Australia.

References

                   

Australian rugby union players
Australia international rugby union players
1892 births
1955 deaths
Rugby union centres